KaXu Solar One (KXSO) is a concentrated solar thermal plant, located in the Northern Cape Region of South Africa, located NE from the town of Pofadder, Khai Ma municipality. KaXu Solar One is 100 megawatts (MW).

The project is developed by the Spanish company Abengoa, and financed with help from Industrial Development Corporation (IDC) and Community Trust group.

See also 

List of solar thermal power stations
Solar thermal energy
List of power stations in South Africa

References

Solar thermal energy
Solar power stations in South Africa
Economy of the Northern Cape